Alceo Dossena (1878–1937) was an Italian sculptor. His dealers marketed his creations as originals by other sculptors.

Biography
Dossena was born in 1878 in Cremona, Italy. He was a talented stonemason and sculptor, and was so skilled at duplicating classical and medieval art, that his agent, Alfredo Fasoli sold his works as authentic antiques. Fasoli commissioned copies of Greek, Roman, medieval, and Renaissance sculptures, and of works by such artists as Giovanni Pisano, Simone Martini, and Donatello. Dossena was meagerly paid by Fasoli who made immense profit off of the copies he sold to museums and collectors. One of the fakes was a sculpted tomb attributed to Mino da Fiesole that was sold to the Boston Museum of Fine Arts.

In 1928 Dossena discovered that some of his works were displayed in museum collections as original antiques, and that his dealers were keeping most of the profit for themselves. The artist was only paid the equivalent of $200 per sale. He exposed the ruse and sued his dealers. Dossena defended himself against forgery charges by claiming that he had been unaware that others were selling his work under false claims. A trial cleared him and he received the equivalent of $66,000 in compensation.

His subsequent exhibit in the New York Metropolitan Museum of Art was unsuccessful. In 1933, the Italian government auctioned 39 of his works for the modest sum of $9000, when a forgery of his sold at a peak price of $150,000.

Alceo Dossena died a poor man in Rome in 1937.

Collections

Two of Dossena's sculptures are on permanent display in the Frick Fine Arts Building at the University of Pittsburgh.  They were intended to appear as if they had been mounted on a Renaissance church, carved by Simone Martini.  The subject matter is the Virgin Mary and angel Gabriel.

Further reading
 David Sox, Unmasking the forger: The Dossena Deception, London: Unwyn Hyman, 1987.
 Frank Arnau, in 1959, published what is still one of the best books about counterfeiting art: "Kunst der Fälscher - Fälscher der Kunst. 3000 Jahre Betrug mit Antiquitäten." It is available in an English translation by J. Maxwell Brownjohn as "The Art of the Faker - 3,000 Years of Deception" and includes a chapter on Alceo Dossena.
 W. Lusetti, Alceo Dossena scultore, Roma, 1955
 Marco Horak, A Piacenza bassorilievo del grande Alceo Dossena, uno dei più enigmatici e controversy protagonist del mondo dell'arte, in "Strenna Piacentina 2013", Piacenza, 2013.
 G. Cellini, Alceo Dossena in "Dizionario Biografico degli Italiani", Roma, 1992, vol. 41.
 Terry Deary, Terry Deary's Terribly True Crime Stories, 1994.
 Marco Horak, Alceo Dossena fra mito e realtà: vita e opera di un genio, Piacenza, 2016,

External links
 

1878 births
1937 deaths
Art forgers
Artists from Cremona
20th-century Italian sculptors
20th-century Italian male artists
Italian male sculptors